The Nestoil Tower is a mixed-use building in Victoria Island, Lagos owned by Nestoil Limited.

Infrastructure 
The Nestoil Towers was built in 2015. It is situated at the intersection between Akin Adesola and Saka Tinubu streets in the district of Victoria island.

The hotel consists of a helipad and 12, 200 metres square commercial space.

The building's fifteen floors are approximately 3900sqm each with about 9904sqm leasable commercial spaces and residential apartments to provide flexible accommodation for occupants. The building also has multi-storey parking and recreational facilities.

The building was designed by ACCL (Adeniyi Cocker Consultants Limited), constructed by Julius Berger PLC, completed in December 2015 and attained the LEED (Leadership in Energy and Environmental Design) standard Certification (Silver) rating.

References

External links

Sustainable buildings in Nigeria
Skyscraper office buildings in Lagos
Mixed-use developments in Lagos
Residential buildings in Lagos
Leadership in Energy and Environmental Design basic silver certified buildings
Towers completed in 2015
21st-century architecture in Nigeria